"I Owe It All to You" is a pop song written by Alonzo, Jim Guthrie, Adam Messinger, and Damhnait Doyle for Eva Avila's debut album Somewhere Else (2006). The song was released as the album's second single in late 2006 and reached number nine on the Canadian BDS Airplay Chart.

Music video
The video is street-themed, with many dancers and Avila singing the song.

Official remixes
Hatiras Remix
Hatiras Vocal Mix
Messinger Remix

Chart performance

References

2006 singles
Eva Avila songs
Songs written by Adam Messinger